The Noble Academy is a public charter high school located in the Near North Side neighborhood in Chicago, Illinois, United States. It is a collaboration between the Noble Network of Charter Schools and Phillips Exeter Academy of New Hampshire. The Noble Academy is a Level 1+ school, based on Chicago Public School rankings.

Student Body 
The Noble Academy has 442 students enrolled for the 2018–2019 school year and is one of the most diverse Chicago Public Schools in the city, attracting students from 47 different zip codes and over 100 elementary schools. 51.8% of the students identify as Hispanic, 41.9% of students identify as Black, 2.9% identify as Asian, 1.6% as White, and 1.8% identify as another race.

Student Programming

Athletics 
The Noble Academy is a part of the Noble Athletic League and has 11 varsity sports. This includes cross country, soccer, football, cheer leading, volleyball, baseball, and softball.

References

External links
Noble Network of Charter Schools

Educational institutions established in 2006
Noble Network of Charter Schools
Public high schools in Chicago
2006 establishments in Illinois